The toy industry in Birmingham (and some other areas) was an economic sector that produced small goods in any material. Edmund Burke described Birmingham in Parliament in 1777 as "the great Toy Shop of Europe".

Hinges, buttons, belt buckles and hooks are all examples of goods that were once considered "toys" and could be produced in metal, leather or glass, amongst others.  The term toy was used starting in the 18th century or earlier to describe the industry in the English Midlands, and changed to its modern form ("toy" as in plaything) years later.  The metalworking legacy still exists in the form of Birmingham's Jewellery Quarter.

Although the toy industry tended to be based on small cottage manufactories at first, the rise of the middle class in London created a demand that led to rapid expansion of the industry in the mid-18th century.  At this point economies of scale started to come into effect, and a number of very large manufactories were built, leading to the common use of the term "factory".  These factories typically had a number of designers that could be called on for any sort of work, while different parts of the building were dedicated to mass production of different sorts of goods.  These early factories were an early step on the road to the assembly line, and an important factor in the creation of the Industrial Revolution.

One major entrepreneur in the toy industry was Matthew Boulton. In 1760 he described the Birmingham buckle trade to a House of Commons select committee, estimating that at least 8,000 were employed, generating £300,000 worth of business, with the majority being for export to Europe. In 1766 Boulton completed his "model manufactory" called Soho Manufactory near Birmingham, powered by a waterwheel, employing one thousand workers. Soho produced high-quality buckles, buttons, boxes, trinkets in steel, gold, sterling silver, goods of ormolu and Sheffield plate.

Range of products
In 1767, Sketchley's Directory outlined the range of products that fell under the designation of "toys":

In 1833, John Holland drew a distinction between Birmingham's manufacture of "heavy steel toys" and "light steel toys". The "heavy steel toys" he compared and contrasted with the "tools" made in Lancashire:

Of "light steel toys", Holland wrote:

References

Sources
 

Toy industry
History of Birmingham, West Midlands
Industrial history of the United Kingdom
Metallurgical industry of the United Kingdom
Toy